Athyroglossa is a genus of shore flies in the family Ephydridae.

Species

A. africana (Wirth, 1955) c
A. argyrata Hendel, 1931 c g
A. atra (Williston, 1896)
A. barrosi Brèthes, 1919 c g
A. cressoni Wirth, 1970 i c g
A. dinorata Mathis & Zatwarnicki, 1990 c g
A. dubia (Williston, 1896)
A. evidens Cresson, 1925 c g
A. fascipennis (Cresson, 1918) c g
A. flaviventris (Meigen, 1830)
A. freta Cresson, 1925 c g
A. glabra (Meigen, 1830)
A. glaphyropus Loew, 1878
A. granulosa (Cresson, 1922) i c g
A. kaplanae Mathis & Zatwarnicki, 1990 c g
A. laevis (Cresson, 1918) i c g
A. leonensis Canzoneri & Rampini, 1987 g
A. lindneri Wirth, 1964 c g
A. lucida Canzoneri & Meneghini, 1969
A. melanderi (Cresson, 1922) i c g
A. metallica Canzoneri & Meneghini, 1969
A. nigripes Miyagi, 1977 c g
A. nitida Williston, 1896
A. nudiuscula Loew, 1873 c g
A. ordinata Becker, 1896 i c g
A. rivalis Miyagi, 1977 c g
A. rossii Canzoneri & Raffone, 1987 g
A. scabra Cresson, 1925 c g
A. schineri Séguy, 1934 c g
A. semiseriata Canzoneri & Meneghini, 1969
A. similis (Cresson, 1918) c g
A. sulcata (Hendel, 1930) c g
A. tectora Cresson, 1926 c g
A. transversa Sturtevant and Wheeler, 1954 i c g

Data sources: i = ITIS, c = Catalogue of Life, g = GBIF, b = Bugguide.net

References

Ephydridae
Taxa named by Hermann Loew
Diptera of North America
Diptera of Europe
Brachycera genera